Indian Creek Township is one of nine townships in Lawrence County, Indiana, United States. As of the 2020 census, its population was 2,736 and it contained 1,176 housing units.

History
Indian Creek Township takes its name from a stream in its northwestern portion. The township was one of the original five townships in Lawrence County. The township boundary originally ran to the East Fork of the White River, including Williams up into the early 20th century.

Geography

Cities, towns, villages
 Oolitic (west edge)

Unincorporated towns
 Coxton at 
 Dark Hollow at 
 Eureka at 
 Fayetteville at 
 Patton Hill at 
 Silverville at 
(This list is based on USGS data and may include former settlements.)

Cemeteries
The township contains nine cemeteries: Boone, Bridge, Fayetteville, Ferguson, New Union Church, Old Shiloh, Old Union Church, Pleasant Hill and Waggner.

State highways
  Indiana State Road 37
  Indiana State Road 158
  Indiana State Road 450
  Indiana State Road 458

Demographics

Education
North Lawrence Community Schools serves Indian Creek Township. A charter school, Lawrence County Independent Schools, is located in Fayetteville.

Fire Department
Indian Creek Township is protected by the Indian Creek Volunteer Fire Department (ICVFD).  The department's 23 members respond to all types of emergencies, including, but not limited to, fire and medical calls, and are often dispatched as medical first responders when an ambulance is dispatched to the township from the nearby City of Bedford.  The department responded to 234 calls in 2012, a record high for the department.  ICVFD has mutual aid agreements with all other volunteer fire departments in Lawrence County.

Political districts
 Indiana's 9th congressional district
 State House District 62
 State Senate District 44

References
 
 United States Census Bureau 2008 TIGER/Line Shapefiles
 IndianaMap

External links
 Indiana Township Association
 United Township Association of Indiana
 City-Data.com page for Indian Creek Township

Townships in Lawrence County, Indiana
Townships in Indiana